The Aire Valley Fault (also known as the Keighley Fault) is an inactive strike slip fault in Yorkshire, England.  It is considered a northwestern continuation of the Morley-Campsall Fault Belt and extends northwards from the Huddersfield and Wakefield area into the South Craven fault.  It is connected to the Denholme Clough Fault.

The fault runs underneath Keighley bus station and the Airedale Shopping Centre, and has caused cracks in the shopping centre.

Further reading
  (map on first page)

References

Geography of the City of Bradford
Geology of West Yorkshire
Seismic faults of the United Kingdom